The following is a complete list of episodes for the television series Yo Momma on MTV.

Season 1

Season 2

Season 3

References

Yo Momma